The Meleager Painter was an ancient Greek vase painter of the Attic red-figure style. He was active in the first third of the 4th century BC. The Meleager Painter followed a tradition started by a group of slightly earlier artists, such as the Mikion Painter. He is probably the most important painter of his generation. He painted a wide variety of vase shapes, including even kylikes, a rarity among his contemporaries. 

His conventional name is derived from several vases depicting hunters, including Atalante and her lover Meleagros. Colonette kraters and bell kraters by him normally bear Dionysiac motifs. Like other painters of his time, he liked to paint figures wearing oriental garb. The tondos inside his kylikes are often framed by wreaths. They mostly depict groups of deities or individual gods. The outsides of kylikes and the paintings on the backs of other vases by him are often of inferior quality.

Bibliography
John D. Beazley. Attic Red Figure Vase Painters. Oxford: Clarendon Press, 1963.
John Boardman. Rotfigurige Vasen aus Athen. Die klassische Zeit, Philipp von Zabern, Mainz, 1991 (Kulturgeschichte der Antiken Welt, Band 48), besonders, p. 176 .

External links

Works at the Metropolitan Museum of Art
Works at the Getty Museum

4th-century BC deaths
Ancient Greek vase painters
Anonymous artists of antiquity
People from Attica
Year of birth unknown